Roslyn Fuller is a Canadian-Irish author and columnist. She is the author of Beasts and Gods: How Democracy Changed its Meaning and Lost its Purpose and In Defence of Democracy.

Education 
Fuller attended North Lambton Secondary School in Forest, Ontario. After finishing high school, Fuller moved to Europe at the age of 19 where she learned German at Clausthal University of Technology, and subsequently studied law with a focus on public international law and legal philosophy at the University of Göttingen.

She then wrote her Ph.D. at Trinity College Dublin, graduating in 2010 with a Ph.D. in law. She completed her dissertation on democracy and international law under thesis supervisor Gernot Biehler.

Academia 
Fuller lectured in law at Trinity College Dublin and Maynooth University, during which she compiled the second edition of Biehler on International Law: An Irish Perspective, which continued the work of Gernot Biehler, her thesis supervisor. She also authored several academic articles on issues ranging from terrorism to participatory democracy and whistleblowing.

Writing and views

Earlier works 
Fuller wrote ISAK, her first novel, in 2005 while studying for the bar exam in Germany. The novel, which is set in the future, is an allegoric reflection of the issue of international terrorism, in particular questioning what precisely constitutes terrorism and which actions by governments or individuals can be subsumed under the term.

In 2007, parts of the novel were adapted as a stage play performed at the Irish Writers' Centre.

In 2008, Fuller co-founded the Irish Writers' Exchange, an organisation of both Irish authors and writers from around the world who have chosen to make Ireland their home away from home. The group contributes book reviews of current and classic fiction for Dublin-based multi-cultural newspaper Metro Éireann. Fuller and her book ISAK were mentioned in the 2009 edition of German travel guide Marco Polo for Dublin

In 2010, Fuller edited and contributed to Dublin: Ten Journeys, One Destination, a collection of short stories published by the Irish Writers' Exchange.

Beasts and Gods: Ancient & Digital Democracy 

In 2015 Zed Books published Fuller's academic research into democracy as a general trade book: Beasts and Gods: How Democracy Changed its Meaning and Lost its Purpose. The book analyses the origins of democracy, its modern applications and the resulting loss of "people power". A contributor to Forbes called Beasts and Gods "a visionary thought experiment . . . guaranteed to make you think differently about the trillion dollar bureaucracies we call democracy today."

In Beast and Gods, Fuller outlines the shortcomings of modern democracy (statistical skewing, corruption, unaccountable politicians) and contrasts the design of modern western democratic systems with both the original democracy in ancient Athens and the Roman Republic, concluding that much of what we think of as democracy today, has in fact, deeply undemocratic, Roman Republican roots. Fuller traces the effects of this democratic deficit from national parliaments to international organisations such as the IMF, World Bank and the UN Security Council.

Fuller then applies the principles of Athenian democracy to modern systems in order to determine how we could use modern information technology to unlock the participatory potential of direct, digital democracy.

Response to Andrew Sullivan 
In May 2016 Andrew Sullivan published an article in New York called "Democracies end when they are too democratic" in which he argued that democracies needed elites to "protect this precious democracy from its own destabilizing excesses". Fuller responded to Sullivan in "Democracy — Too Much of a Good Thing?". Matt Taibbi called it "an amusing exploration of the topic"  and it became the topic of a class assignment at Duke University.

In Defence of Democracy and opposition to "sortition-ism" 
In 2019, Fuller followed up on Beasts and Gods with the publication of In Defence of Democracy, which debunks the theories of academics and writers across the political spectrum who believe that voters are either too stupid, too racist or too crazy for democracy. She argues that these ideas are based on questionable empirical research, and that democracy is not about “right” or “wrong” outcomes, but simply a method of mediating conflict. Fuller also demonstrates that one of the commonly proposed political reforms – randomly selecting citizens into citizen assemblies or decision-making bodies (also called sortition) – not only misconstrues the role sortition played in the ancient Athenian democracy but ultimately enhances elite control by limiting decisions to small, externally controllable groups.

In 2020, In Defense of Democracy was selected as a finalist for the Next Generation Indie Book Awards.

Election campaign 
In 2016, Fuller ran as an Independent candidate in the 2016 Irish general election. She received 775 votes.

She ran on a platform of digital democracy. Following the election, Roslyn has implemented her election promise of direct people participation by conducting the first Digital Democracy experiment in Ireland, in which she asked people in her electoral area of Dublin Fingal to discuss and decide on a number of local and national policy priorities. She has stated that she intends to take action on the outcome of the initiative as part of her election promise.

Modeling 

Fuller worked as a model between 2005 and 2012, especially in the areas of fine art, glamour and nude art work. She has posed for some of Ireland's best-known photographers (Vincent O’Byrne, Mike Brown - in 2012 nominated for the Black Spider Award for one of his photos of Fuller) and artists (Isobel Henihan, Sahoko Blake, the RHA). She has also worked abroad in Germany, the UK and Canada and has popularised Bodypainting in Ireland, having been chosen three times to
model at the World Bodypainting Festival in Austria for special effects artist Raquel Guirro (Pan's Labyrinth). She is extremely short: only 4’10".

Articles about her have been published in Hotpress, the Sunday World, Irish News of the World, Irish Daily Star, Irish Daily Star on Sunday among others.

In 2009, she appeared on the TV show Ireland AM with bodypainter Nina Moore to publicise the World Bodypainting Festival
 as well as enjoyed radio coverage on RTÉ's Mooney Show.

In 2013 Fuller set up Wikilicious.net to raise money for organisations supporting whistle-blowers. For the project she combined photos from her modelling career with information on whistle-blowers throughout recent history. The project has been widely covered in media around the world.

From 2012 to 2014, Fuller organised the annual Irish Bodypainting Competition, which has attracted media attention in Ireland, the UK and the US.

References

External links 

1980 births
Female models from Ontario
Canadian women non-fiction writers
Irish female models
Living people
Writers from Ontario
Alumni of Trinity College Dublin
21st-century Canadian women writers
Irish people of Canadian descent
Canadian columnists
Canadian women columnists
Irish columnists
Irish women non-fiction writers
Irish women columnists
Clausthal University of Technology alumni